July 24 - Eastern Orthodox calendar - July 26

All fixed commemorations below are celebrated on August 7 by Old Calendar.

For July 25th, Orthodox Churches on the Old Calendar commemorate the Saints listed on July 12.

Saints
 The Dormition of the Righteous Anna, Mother of the Most Holy Theotokos.
 The Holy Martyrs of Lyons: (c. 177)  (see also: June 2)
 Pothinus, Bishop of Lyons, Sanctus the Deacon, Maturus, Attalus, Blandina, Vettius, Epagathus, Biblis, Ponticus, Alexander, and those with them, at Lyon.
 Righteous Olympias the Deaconess, of Constantinople (410)
 Virgin-martyr Eupraxia of Tabennisi (413) (see also: March 13)
 Saint Elias of Thessaloniki, Metropolitan of Thessaloniki, who played a leading role in the Fifth Ecumenical Council (c. 553)

Pre-Schism Western saints
 Saint James the Greater, the son of Zebedee and brother of St John the Evangelist (44)  (see also: April 30 - East)
 Saints Florentius and Felix, two soldiers martyred under Maximinius the Thracian at Furcona near Aquila in the south of Italy (235)
 Martyr Cucuphas of Barcelona (Cucufate, Cugat, Guinefort, Qoqofas), a martyr of Spain (304)
 Saint Nessan (Neasán), a convert of St Patrick of Ireland, he became Abbot of Montgarth (Mountgarret, Mungret) in Wexford (5th century)
 Saint Magnericus of Trier, Bishop of Trier in Germany (596)
 Saint Ebrulfus (Evroult), born in Beauvais in France, he became a hermit and later founded a monastery at Saint-Fuscien-aux-Bois (fr) (c. 600)
 Saint Glodesinda of Metz, a nun in Metz in France, where she later became abbess (c. 608)
 Saint Theodemir of Córdoba, a monk martyred in Córdoba in Spain under Abderrahman II (851)

Post-Schism Orthodox saints
 Venerable Macarius of Zheltovod and Unzha, Abbot and Wonderworker (1444)
 Venerable Christopher of Solvychegodsk in Vologda, Abbot (1572)
 Saint Gregory (Kallidis), Metropolitan of Thessalonica and of Heraclea (1925)  (see also: June 29)

New martyrs and confessors
 New Hieromartyr Nicholas Udintsev, Priest (1918)
 New Hieromartyr Alexander Sakharov, Priest (1927)
 New Hieromartyr Theodore Tonkovid, Priest of Lovets, Pskov (1942)
 New Hieromartyrs Vukosav Milanovic and Rodoljub Samardzic, of Kulen Vakuf, Serbia (1941-1945)
 Saint Iraida Tikhova, Confessor (1967)

Other commemorations
 Commemoration of the Holy 165 Fathers of the Fifth Ecumenical Council, who refuted the doctrines of Origen (553)

Icon gallery

Notes

References

Sources
 July 25/August 7. Orthodox Calendar (PRAVOSLAVIE.RU).
 August 7 / July 25. HOLY TRINITY RUSSIAN ORTHODOX CHURCH (A parish of the Patriarchate of Moscow).
 July 25. OCA - The Lives of the Saints.
 July 25. The Year of Our Salvation - Holy Transfiguration Monastery, Brookline, Massachusetts. 
 The Autonomous Orthodox Metropolia of Western Europe and the Americas (ROCOR). St. Hilarion Calendar of Saints for the year of our Lord 2004. St. Hilarion Press (Austin, TX). pp. 54–55.
 The Twenty-Fifth Day of the Month of July. Orthodoxy in China.
 July 25. Latin Saints of the Orthodox Patriarchate of Rome.
 The Roman Martyrology. Transl. by the Archbishop of Baltimore. Last Edition, According to the Copy Printed at Rome in 1914. Revised Edition, with the Imprimatur of His Eminence Cardinal Gibbons. Baltimore: John Murphy Company, 1916. pp. 219–220.
 Rev. Richard Stanton. A Menology of England and Wales, or, Brief Memorials of the Ancient British and English Saints Arranged According to the Calendar, Together with the Martyrs of the 16th and 17th Centuries. London: Burns & Oates, 1892. pp. 357–358.

 Greek Sources
 Great Synaxaristes:  25 ΙΟΥΛΙΟΥ. ΜΕΓΑΣ ΣΥΝΑΞΑΡΙΣΤΗΣ.
  Συναξαριστής. 25 Ιουλίου. ECCLESIA.GR. (H ΕΚΚΛΗΣΙΑ ΤΗΣ ΕΛΛΑΔΟΣ). 
  25/07/. Ορθόδοξος Συναξαριστής.

 Russian Sources
  7 августа (25 июля). Православная Энциклопедия под редакцией Патриарха Московского и всея Руси Кирилла (электронная версия). (Orthodox Encyclopedia - Pravenc.ru).
  25 июля по старому стилю / 7 августа по новому стилю. СПЖ "Союз православных журналистов". .
  25 июля (ст.ст.) 7 августа  (нов. ст.). Русская Православная Церковь Отдел внешних церковных связей. (DECR).

July in the Eastern Orthodox calendar